Opala is a territory in the Tshopo Province of the Democratic Republic of the Congo.

The administrative center is the town of Opala. Other communities are Yatolema, Lokilo and Mayoko.
The territory is divided into Sectors and Chiefdoms:
Balinga-Lindja Sector
Yawende-Loolo Sector
Yeyango Chiefdom
Yomale Chiefdom
Yalingo Chiefdom
Iye Sector
Yapandu Chiefdom
Mongo Chiefdom
Kembe Chiefdom
Opala Sector

References

Territories of Tshopo Province